Irving Christian Wright (1882–1953) was an American male tennis player who was active in the early 20th century.

Career
In 1907 Irving won the Long Island Lawn Tennis Championship. 
In 1917 he won the U.S. National Championship mixed doubles championship with Norwegian Molla Bjurstedt by defeating Bill Tilden and Florence Ballin in three sets. The next year he successfully defended the title, this time partnering Hazel Hotchkiss Wightman, winning against Molla Bjurstedt and Fred Alexander in straight sets.

In 1917 he also reached the final of the U.S. National Championship men's doubles competition with Harry Johnson but lost in straight sets to Fred Alexander and Harold Throckmorton.

Irving was the son of George Wright, an American baseball pioneer and one of the founders of the Wright & Ditson sporting goods firm and the brother of  U.S. Championship winner and Olympic gold medalist Beals Wright. Together they won the men's doubles title at the Canadian Tennis Championship four times (1902, 1903, 1904, 1905). Irving Wright was president of Longwood Cricket Club and vice president of A. G. Spalding.

Grand Slam finals

Doubles (1 runner-up)

Mixed doubles (2 titles)

References

External links
 

1882 births
1953 deaths
20th-century American people
American male tennis players
United States National champions (tennis)
Grand Slam (tennis) champions in mixed doubles
Tennis players from Boston